Kotda Nayani is a village and former non-salute princely state on Saurastra peninsula in Gujarat, western India.

History 
Kotda Nayani was a petty princely state and colonial thana, comprising only the village, in the Halar prant of Kathiawar, ruled by Jadeja Rajput Chieftains.

It had a population of 1,365 in 1901, yielding a state revenue of 16,135 Rupees (1903-4, mostly from land) and a paying a tribute of 347 Rupees, to the British and Junagadh State.

In 1943, with the implementation of the 'attachment scheme', when Kotda-Nayani thana, Hadala taluka and Mali(y)a state were merged into Morvi State, that thus enlarged its territory by an additional 310 km² with about 12,500 inhabitants, and on 15 February 1948 merged into the United State of Kathiawar after the 1947 accession to India, which later merged into Gujarat.

Sources and external links
 Imperial Gazetteer, on dsal.uchicago.edu

Princely states of Gujarat
Rajput princely states